Nasruddin was originally a honorific title and is a masculine given name and surname of Arabic origin. There are many variant spellings in English due to transliteration including Nasir al-Din, and Nasiruddin. 

The most notable person with this name is the 13th-century philosopher, Sufi and wise man from Turkey, Nasreddin Hodja. Other people with the title or name include:

People with the given name Nasruddin 
 Nasreddin or Nasreddin Hodja, 13th century Seljuq satirist, populist philosopher, Sufi and wise man
 Nasruddin (reigned 1690–1710), 15th Sultan of Brunei
 Nasruddin Khan, emir of Kokand 1875–1876
 Nasruddin Mohseni (fl. from 2002), Afghan politician

People with the surname Nasruddin 
 Azman Nasruddin (born 1972), Malaysian politician
 Nadhirah Nasruddin (born 1994), Malaysian cricketer

See also 
 ad-Din, Arabic name suffix
 Nasir al-Din (disambiguation)
 Nasreddin (crater)
 Molla Nasraddin (magazine)
 Nimatnama-i-Nasiruddin-Shahi, 16th-century medieval Indian cookbook, written in Persian language

Arabic masculine given names